Attack of the Movies 3D is a rail shooter video game developed by Panic Button and published by Majesco Entertainment for the Wii and Xbox 360. It is one of the first games developed by Panic Button. The game transports players into six movie-themed worlds where they will battle large alien space cruisers, shoots underwater monsters and more, only to discover the reason these movies come to life.

Gameplay

Reception

The game received "generally unfavorable reviews" on both platforms according to the review aggregation website Metacritic. Justin Cheng of Nintendo Power criticized the short length of the levels throughout the six environments, the enemy creatures and a lack of variety amongst similar weapons, calling it "a lackluster 3-D light-gun shooter." Game Informer senior editor Jeff Cork felt the different levels played identically with nondescript targets, showed a lack of "branching paths or variations in the gameplay", and called out the 3D elements for being "a mixed blessing – the game is so offensively ugly that I didn’t want it getting any closer to me than necessary." He concluded that: "The dubious benefit of the game's 3D effects is offset by its one-dimensional gameplay. Rail shooters don't get much more tedious, lifeless, or ugly than Attack of the Movies 3-D."

References

External links
 

2010 video games
Majesco Entertainment games
Multiplayer and single-player video games
North America-exclusive video games
Rail shooters
Video games developed in the United States
Wii games
Xbox 360 games